The Brian Benben Show is an American sitcom television series that aired on CBS on Mondays from September 21, 1998 to October 12, 1998. The show rated poorly and was dropped after 4 of the 9 episodes made were aired.

Premise
The show centered on Brian Benben, an anchor on KYLA-TV news in Los Angeles, who was replaced in favor of a younger person. Brian was later able to return to the station as a replacement for a human interest reporter who was killed covering an ape exhibit at a zoo.

Cast
 Brian Benben as Brian Benben
 Susan Blommaert as Beverly Shippel
 Wendell Pierce as Kevin La Rue
 Lisa Thornhill as Tabitha Berkeley
 Charles Esten as Chad Rockwell
 Luis Antonio Ramos as Billy Hernandez
 Lisa Vidal as Julie

Episodes

References

External links

1998 American television series debuts
1998 American television series endings
1990s American sitcoms
CBS original programming
Television shows set in Los Angeles
Television series by Warner Bros. Television Studios